Morning Call is an American TV business program that aired on CNBC, from 10AM to 12 noon ET weekdays. The show premiered as Midday Call on February 4, 2002, offered a clear focus on real-time market coverage at the heart of the trading day. Previous programs shown in the same time slot were The Money Wheel with Ted David and Martha MacCallum (who later joined Fox News Channel) and Market Watch. The program last aired August 8, 2007.

About the program
On February 3, 2006, Ted David, who had co-anchored Morning Call with Liz Claman since 2003, left the program while being promoted to senior anchor at CNBC Business Radio.  From  to 2007-07-17, Claman was joined in the 10-11am hour by Mark Haines (who reported from the New York Stock Exchange), and in the 11am-noon hour by various anchors, including Dylan Ratigan (see anchor roster below).

On July 20, 2007, CNBC replaced the first hour of the two-hour program with an expanded Squawk on the Street, due in part to Claman's departure from the network (which she joined Fox News Channel's sister network financial unit three months later).  Dylan Ratigan and Trish Regan served as interim anchors for the program, which was completely revamped on 2007-07-23.  In addition to the aforementioned 2007-07-23 revamp, the anchors were joined on set by a guest contributor, very similar to Squawk Box.

On August 8, 2007, the show was renamed—and replaced—by The Call.  The name change to The Call with Dylan Ratigan (who left the show in late 2008 and was replaced by Larry Kudlow), Melissa Francis, and Trish Regan on that date was due in part to avoid confusion with the early-morning  Bloomberg Television program of the same name.

Anchor roster

Segments
The following segments below were carried over to The Call as of 2007-08-08:

 Here's The Morning Call On...: The appropriately-titled first segment of the show looked at the morning's business headlines.
 The Bond Report: Rick Santelli reported from Chicago with a look at the US Bond market.
 Your Best Trades Now: A guest joined the show with the anchors and a guest contributor to talk about what his/her best stock picks are right now. 
 Stocks To Watch: Bob O'Brien (formerly of The Wall Street Journal, now with Barron's) looked at the US stocks making news.      
 MSNBC News Update: News headlines from outside the world of business.  Seen shortly after the bottom of the hour.
 CNBC.com Biz Wire: The latest business headlines from CNBC.com.
 2 Hours Into the Trading Day...: An update on the U.S. stock markets after the first 2 hours of trading.  Seen at the start of the program's second half-hour.
 CNBC.com Blog Watch: Seen during the program's second half-hour with a look at the key business stories blogged by CNBC reporters, such as Jim Goldman ("Tech Check"), Diana Olick ("Realty Check") and Darren Rovell ("Sports Biz").   
 The Journal Report: Seen on Mondays with a reporter from The Wall Street Journal.
 Seidman Speaks: CNBC's chief commentator Bill Seidman makes a guest appearance and answers viewers' Email questions.  Seen on Thursdays.
 Mutual Fund Pick and Pan of the Week: Seen on Fridays with Christine Benz of Morningstar.
 European Market Wrap Up: The last segment of the program features a wrap-up of the close of the European stock markets (barring breaking news).

The following segments below moved to the second hour of Squawk on the Street as of 2007-07-23:

 Weekly Energy Inventory Data: Seen at 10:30am ET on Wednesdays and Thursdays.  Sharon Epperson reports from the NYMEX on the weekly inventory data for crude oil, gasoline, distillates (on Wednesdays), and natural gas (on Thursdays).
 Suze Says: This segment, with Suze Orman, is seen on Mondays.
 Fast Money Trade School: Seen on Tuesdays and Thursdays, this segment features one of the traders from the CNBC TV program, Fast Money.
 Jim Cramer's Road Rules: Mad Money's Jim Cramer sets out one of his "road rules" from his previous book, Jim Cramer's Mad Money: Watch TV, Get Rich.  Seen on Wednesdays and Fridays.

On location
Occasionally, Morning Call was broadcast live on location, such as the NYMEX.  One of these examples came on May 31, 2007, when this program was named Morning Call, Liz Claman anchored the entire 2-hour program from the NYMEX (along with Haines at the NYSE for the first hour and Ratigan at CNBC Global Headquarters in Englewood Cliffs, NJ for the second hour).  She was joined on location at the NYMEX by Sharon Epperson on the day the weekly crude oil, gasoline, distillate, and natural gas inventories report were released by the EIA.

CNBC Europe
The second hour of Morning Call was not seen on CNBC Europe as the European network instead aired European Closing Bell at 1700 Central European Time.  As of July 19, 2007, this program (which was later renamed The Call, as mentioned above) is no longer broadcast on CNBC Europe apart from on European market holidays and during daylight saving time.

Worldwide Morning Call
Around CNBC's global branches, there were many variations of Morning Call around the world:

See also
 Asia Market Watch (discontinued after 2007-03-23)
 Morning Exchange (discontinued after 2005-12-16)
 Worldwide Exchange
 The Call

References

External links
 
 Morning Call formerly official blog: The Morning Blog on Windows Live Spaces (2005-10 - 2006-12-03)
 New "Morning Blog" on CNBC.com: Wake Up Call (Since 2006-12-04)

2002 American television series debuts
2007 American television series endings
2000s American television news shows
2000s American television talk shows
Business-related television series
CNBC original programming
CNBC Europe original programming
CNBC Asia original programming